William Skoreyko (December 8, 1922 – September 28, 1987) was a businessman, service station owner, and politician from Alberta, Canada.

Bio 
Skoreyko first ran for election to the House of Commons of Canada in the district of Edmonton East in the 1958 federal election; he defeated incumbent Social Credit MP Ambrose Holowach. He and 207 other Progressive Conservatives (PCs) were elected. He began his parliamentary career as a backbencher in Prime Minister John Diefenbaker's caucus.

Although he never ranked highly in his party's hierarchy or that of the House of Commons, Skoreyko has a unique electoral history as regards his opponents, several of whom had been or would later be successful politicians in other offices. In the 1962 federal election, which was hotly contested both in Edmonton East and nationally, he defeated Liberal candidate John Decore, former MP for Vegreville, and Social Credit candidate Lucien Maynard, former Attorney-General of Alberta.

In the 1963 election, Skoreyko again defeated Maynard, as well as New Democratic Party candidate Ivor Dent, who later became mayor of Edmonton. In 1965, his Social Credit opponent was a young Preston Manning, the son of Alberta premier Ernest Manning and future leader of the Reform Party of Canada. He retired at the 1979 Canadian federal election undefeated after serving seven consecutive terms, in the 24th, 25th, 26th, 27th, 28th, 29th, and 30th Canadian Parliaments.

External links

1922 births
1987 deaths
Businesspeople from Edmonton
Canadian people of Ukrainian descent
Members of the House of Commons of Canada from Alberta
Politicians from Edmonton
Progressive Conservative Party of Canada MPs